East Baratang Group are an island group of the Andaman Islands, located east of Baratang Island.

Geography
The major islands in the group are Long, Strait, North Passage, Colebrooke, and Guitar.

Administration
Politically, the East Baratang Islands are part of Rangat Taluk.

References 

 Geological Survey of India

Archipelagoes of the Andaman and Nicobar Islands
North and Middle Andaman district